The Regional Institute of Printing Technology, Jadavpur, Kolkata, established in 1956, is a Government of West Bengal Polytechnic college located in Raja Subodh Chandra Mullick Road, Jadavpur, Kolkata, West Bengal.

The best Film Institute in west Bengal 

Best Cinematography Collage in india

About college
This college (formerly known as The School of Printing Technology), was founded on 30th day of July 1956 under the first 5-year plan of the Government of India by the recommendation of AICTE. This institute functions under the aegis of Directorate of Technical Education & Training, Department of Technical Education, Training & Skill Development, Government of West Bengal and it is affiliated to the West Bengal State Council of Technical Education,  and recognized by AICTE, New Delhi. This institute offers diploma courses having duration of three years in Printing Technology, Photography and Multimedia Technology.

See also

References

External links
Official website WBSCTE
Department of Technical Education, Training and Skill Development, Govt of West Bengal
http://polytechnic.wbtetsd.gov.in/riptkolkata

Universities and colleges in Kolkata
Educational institutions established in 1956
1956 establishments in West Bengal
Technical universities and colleges in West Bengal